"When Alexander Takes His Ragtime Band to France" is a World War I era song written by Alfred Bryan, Cliff Hess, and Edgar Leslie in 1918. The song was performed by Marion Harris and released as a single by Victor Records in June 1918.

Sheet music 
Albert Barbelle provided the cover illustration for the sheet music, which features a drawing of a marching band.  Belle Baker is featured in the photograph inset.

Reception
Marion Harris' performance of When Alexander Takes His Ragtime Band to France reached number four on the US song charts in 1918.{{refn|group=nb|Joel Whitburn's methodology for creating pre-1940s chart placings has been criticised,<ref>[https://songbook1.wordpress.com/fx/joel-whitburn-criticism-chart-fabrication-misrepresentation-of-sources-cherry-picking/  "Joel Whitburn criticism: chart fabrication, misrepresentation of sources, cherry picking", Songbook]</ref> and they should not be taken as definitive.}}

See also
 Alexander's Ragtime Band

Notes

References

External links
Audio file of When Alexander Takes His Ragtime Band to France'' 

Songs about musicians
1918 songs
Songs of World War I
Songs with lyrics by Alfred Bryan
Songs written by Edgar Leslie
Songs about France